Indian Arrows is an AIFF developmental club based which plays in I-League. The club was formed in 2010 as AIFF XI before being renamed as Pailan Arrows in 2011.

Indian Arrows have never won the League championship, and the Federation Cup.

Seasons 

Note:

Pailan Arrows
Pailan Arrows
Pailan Arrows
Indian Arrows FC seasons
Indian Arrows FC-related lists